Empty Beaches is the third studio album by alternative rock band Cecimonster Vs. Donka from Lima, Peru.

Track listing

Personnel 
Band Members
 Sergio Saba – vocals, guitar
 Sebastian Kouri –  guitar
 Alonso García – bass guitar
 Sandro Labenita – Drums

Additional personnel

 Bruno Bellatin and Julio Alvarado – Production and engineering
 Saito Chinén – Mixing and mastering

References 

2015 albums
Cecimonster Vs. Donka albums